Man & His Music (Remixes from Around the World) is a 1987 remix album by hip hop group Boogie Down Productions honouring the memory of DJ Scott La Rock. The album was re-issued on September 23, 1997.

Critical reception
Trouser Press called the album "an unessential posthumous collection of remixes and early demos, including a track by D-Nice [the performer Rock was aiding when Rock was shot]." Record Collector wrote that "while always a pleasure to hear the brutally stripped-down sound which turned hip-hop upside-down when South Bronx appeared in 1986, spread over 75 minutes the reruns here sometimes threaten to compromise their impact."

Track listing
"Advance"
"Poetry #1"
"BDP Medley #5"
"Word From Our Sponsor #8"
"Red Alert" (Criminal Minded)
"Super Hoe #4" (Mixed by DJ Spen and Thomas Gray in Baltimore)
"BDP Medley #7"
"BDP Medley #11"
"Doc Mix" (Criminal Minded)
"Poetry #2"
"Criminal Minded #8"
"D Nice Rocks The House"
"Poetry #3"
"Criminal Minded #6"
"? #10"

References

Boogie Down Productions albums
1997 remix albums
Jive Records remix albums
Albums produced by KRS-One